Lying in repose is the tradition in which the body of a deceased person, often of high social stature, is made available for public viewing. Lying in repose differs from the more formal honor of lying in state, which is generally held at the principal government building of the deceased person's country and often accompanied by a guard of honour.

United States
In the United States of America, "lying in state" is generally considered to be when one's body is placed in the rotunda of the United States Capitol. When the deceased person is placed in another location, like the Great Hall of the Supreme Court, they lie in repose, as was the case following the deaths of Justices Antonin Scalia in February 2016 and Ruth Bader Ginsburg in September 2020.

The remains of presidents who die in office generally lie in repose in the East Room of the White House while those of a deceased former president generally lie in repose in his home state. However, as an example to the contrary, when the body of John F. Kennedy lay in repose, the term meant "private" as opposed to a public lying in state.

The body of Babe Ruth lay in repose in Yankee Stadium.

Not everyone eligible to lie in state in the Capitol Rotunda does so. For instance, the body of former President Richard Nixon lay in repose at the Richard Nixon Presidential Library in Yorba Linda, California, Senator Edward Kennedy's body lay in repose at the John F. Kennedy Library in Boston, Massachusetts, and Senator Robert Byrd's body lay in repose in the Senate chamber at the Capitol.

Canada
In Canada, when deceased governors general and prime ministers lie anywhere outside of the Centre Block of Parliament Hill, they lie in repose. In the Hall of Honour, the Senate, or the foyer of the House of Commons, they lie in state.

At the provincial, territorial or local levels, current and former politicians may lie in state or repose in government buildings.

See also
 Ancient Greek funeral and burial practices
Caisson
Catafalque
Funeral train
Missing man formation
Riderless horse
State funeral
Vigil of the Princes

References

External links

Lying in repose vs lying in state at The Phrase Finder

Death customs